Edward E. Berger (July 29, 1945) is an American educator and politician from the state of Kansas. A Republican, Berger has represented the 34th district of the Kansas Senate, based in Reno County, since 2017. He was defeated in the 2020 Republican primary by doctor Mark Steffen.

Berger was first elected after defeating Senate Majority Leader Terry Bruce in the 2016 Republican primary, a victory that was attributed to Berger's opposition to income tax cuts that Bruce had championed. Prior to his election to the Senate, Berger served as the president of Hutchinson Community College for 23 years, and continues to run his own consulting business.

Berger lives in Hutchinson with his wife Carol; they have two children.

References

Living people
Republican Party Kansas state senators
21st-century American politicians
Wichita State University alumni
Kansas State University alumni
1945 births